Flavobacterium daejeonense is a Gram-negative and rod-shaped bacterium from the genus of Flavobacterium which has been isolated from greenhouse soil from Daejeon in Korea.

References

 

daejeonense
Bacteria described in 2006